William Rayford Price (February 9, 1937 – February 21, 2023) was an American politician. He served as a Democratic member in the Texas House of Representatives from 1961 to 1973. From 1972 to 1973, he served as Speaker of the Texas House of Representatives.

Price died on February 21, 2023, at the age of 86.

References

1937 births
2023 deaths
Democratic Party members of the Texas House of Representatives
People from Jacksonville, Texas
Speakers of the Texas House of Representatives